Resende is a town (vila) in Resende Municipality in Viseu District in Portugal. The population in 2011 was 3,166, in an area of 11.88 km2.

References

Towns in Portugal
Freguesias of Resende, Portugal